Keitumetse Paul (19 May 1973 - 13 August 2021) was a Botswanan former footballer who played as a midfielder. He played for the Botswana national football team between 1995 and 2002. He coached the under-20s national football team between 2015 and 2020.

On 13 August 2021, he died from complications linked to COVID-19.

External links

1973 births
2021 deaths
Association football midfielders
Botswana footballers
Botswana international footballers
Mochudi Centre Chiefs SC players
Chico Rooks players
Uniao Flamengo Santos F.C. players
USL League Two players
Expatriate soccer players in the United States
Deaths from the COVID-19 pandemic in Botswana